Joe Jon "J. J." Finley (born January 30, 1985) is an American football coach and former tight end who is currently the associate head coach for offense and tight ends & h-backs coach at the University of Oklahoma. He played college football at Oklahoma before signing with the San Francisco 49ers of the National Football League (NFL) as an undrafted free agent in 2008.

Early life and high school 
Finley grew up in Arlington, Texas and attended Arlington High School, where he played football and was a hurdler on the school's track team. Initially a tight end as a sophomore, Finley was moved to quarterback for his junior and senior years of high school, throwing for over 1,600 yards and rushing for nearly 900 yards in his senior season. He committed to playing college football at Oklahoma.

College career 

Finley entered Oklahoma as a quarterback, but converted to tight end due to lack of playing time. His breakout season came in 2006 when offensive coordinator Kevin Wilson switched from offensive line coach to tight ends coach, where Finley recorded 19 receptions for 241 yards and three touchdowns. He was praised for his ability to block, run routes, and catch passes, something that Oklahoma's other tight ends Jermaine Gresham and Brody Eldridge were unable to do.

As a redshirt senior, Finley was named team captain and improved on his numbers, catching 23 passes for 290 yards and four touchdowns. He finished his career with 62 catches for 775 yards, which ranked in the top 10 among Oklahoma tight ends as of 2021. Finley also earned honorable Big 12 mentions as a junior and senior and was an All-Academic Big 12.

Professional career

San Francisco 49ers 

Finley signed with the San Francisco 49ers as an undrafted free agent in 2008. He never made the active roster during his time in San Francisco, spending 2008 and 2009 on the practice squad before being cut before the start of the 2010 regular season.

Detroit Lions 
Finley signed with the Detroit Lions practice squad in 2010, where he spent the entire season on the practice squad. Although he was waived in the final roster cuts in 2011, Finley was signed to the active roster in 2011 for the Lions' week 6 game against the 49ers before being released in late October.

Carolina Panthers 
Finley was signed by the Carolina Panthers on May 16, 2012. He was released by the Panthers on August 31, 2012 in the final roster cuts before the start of the regular season.

Coaching career 
After getting cut by the Lions, Finley spent 2011 as the offensive line coach at Los Fresnos High School in Texas, where his brother Clint was the head coach. He was later a graduate assistant at his alma mater Oklahoma from 2012 to 2013, taking a break to sign with the Carolina Panthers and returning after he was cut. Finley returned to Los Fresnos in 2014 as their offensive line coach and strength & conditioning coordinator before departing to be an offensive quality control analyst at Baylor in 2015.

Finley was named the tight ends coach at Missouri in 2016. At Missouri, he coached a group that led the nation in touchdowns scored by tight ends with 15 in 2017, while developing Albert Okwuegbunam, who was an All-SEC second-teamer and finalist for the John Mackey Award in 2018. Finley left Missouri to coach tight ends at Texas A&M under Jimbo Fisher in 2018. He spent only one season at Texas A&M as he joined the coaching staff at Ole Miss in 2020 as their passing game coordinator and tight ends coach. The move was one of over 300 coaching changes stemming from the 2019 Egg Bowl game between Ole Miss and Mississippi State in which Ole Miss wide receiver Elijah Moore was penalized for his touchdown celebration in the final seconds, leading to a missed extra point and an Ole Miss loss.

Finley was named the associate head coach for offense at his alma mater Oklahoma in 2021. In the same announcement, it was said that he would coach the Sooners' tight ends and h-backs, while also overseeing elements of their special teams unit.

Personal life 
Finley and his wife Caylee have four children; daughters Blakely, Scout, and Collier and son Knox. Finley's father Mickey was a longtime high school football coach and was Joe Jon's coach in high school.

References

External links 
 
 Oklahoma Sooners profile

1985 births
Living people
Sportspeople from Arlington, Texas
Players of American football from Texas
Coaches of American football from Texas
American football tight ends
American football quarterbacks
Oklahoma Sooners football players
San Francisco 49ers players
Detroit Lions players
Carolina Panthers players
High school football coaches in Texas
Oklahoma Sooners football coaches
Baylor Bears football coaches
Missouri Tigers football coaches
Texas A&M Aggies football coaches
Ole Miss Rebels football coaches